Lamé  may refer to:

Lamé (fabric), a clothing fabric with metallic strands
Lamé (fencing), a jacket used for detecting hits
Lamé (crater) on the Moon
Ngeté-Herdé language, also known as Lamé, spoken in Chad
Peve language, also known as Lamé after its chief dialect, spoken in Chad and Cameroon
Lamé, a couple of the Masa languages of West Africa
Amy Lamé (born 1971), British radio presenter
Gabriel Lamé (1795–1870), French mathematician

See also
Lamé curve, geometric figure
Lamé parameters
Lame (disambiguation)
Lame (kitchen tool), occasionally misspelled lamé